Wing Commander Jag Mohan Nath , was an Indian Air Force officer . He is the first of the six officers to have been decorated with the Maha Vir Chakra, India's second highest war time military decoration, twice. He was decorated for his operations in the Sino-Indian War of 1962 and Indo-Pakistani War of 1965.

Early life
Jag Mohan Nath was born in Jaipur then grew in Layyah, Punjab, British India (now in Pakistan) in a Punjabi Hindu family of doctors. He served in the Air Force from 1948 to 1969, before taking up a position in Air India.

Military career
He joined the Air Force Administrative College in Coimbatore in 1948. He was first awarded the Maha Vir Chakra for his role in reconnaissance missions in Aksai Chin and Tibet, before and during the 1962 war. His missions proved useful in learning about the Chinese military build-up in Aksai Chin. He flew around 30 reconnaissance missions into Pakistan during the 1965 war in an English Electric Canberra, which earned him his second Maha Vir Chakra. He would go over Pakistani territory including Lahore, Icchogil canal and Sargoda. In eastern Ladakh, Nath would fly into Chinese occupied territory. He had stated in an interview that "the Chinese could see me clearly and even fired at my aircraft," but other than that could do little as the Chinese did not have an air force at the time.

Controversy
In an interview, Wing Commander Nath claimed that a mole was detected in the Indian Air Force's Western Command during the 1965 war. The mole was a group captain handling flight movements in the Western Command, though he declined to name the person as he was already dead.

References 

Military personnel from Punjab, India
20th-century Indian military personnel
Recipients of the Maha Vir Chakra
Reconnaissance pilots